The Best Day is the fourth solo studio album by the American alternative rock musician Thurston Moore, released on October 20, 2014 on Matador Records. The album cover is a photograph of Moore's mother, Eleanor Moore, circa 1940 and a photograph of Moore's parents as artwork.

Release
The Best Day was announced for release in March 2014 on Sonic Youths official news blog. A month prior to its announcement, Moore released "Detonation" as a standalone 7-inch single, backed with "Germs Burn" as its B-side, on the independent English label Blank Editions as part of its Solo Series.

A formal announcement of The Best Day, including cover art, a track listing and release dates, was made on August 20 by Matador Records. The album was released on October 20 in Denmark, France, Sweden and the United Kingdom; October 21 in Spain and the United States; and October 24 in Germany, Ireland, the Netherlands and Switzerland. Officially licensed streams of the album were made available on NPR Music and The Guardians official web sites a week prior to its international release. The Best Day will be issued as a double LP, single CD and as a digital download, with the first 100 U.S. LP pressings featuring an autographed poster.

Track listing

Personnel
The Thurston Moore Band
 Thurston Moore – vocals, guitar
 James Sedwards – guitar
 Debbie Googe – bass
 Steve Shelley – drums

Release history

References

2014 albums
Thurston Moore albums
Matador Records albums